Yangpu District is one of the 16 districts of Shanghai. It is located in northeastern part of downtown Shanghai, bordering the Huangpu River on the east and south, Hongkou District on the west, and Baoshan District on the north. The district administers 12 subdistricts.

Name
The name Yangshupu, formerly romanized as Yangtzepoo or Yangtszepoo, is Chinese for "poplar bank" and refers to the creek running through the area beside present-day Lanzhou Rd (formerly Lay Road) from the Qiu River in the north to the Huangpu River in the south. Yangshupu District was established in 1945, but the Shanghai Municipal Government contracted the name to Yangpu in 1950.

History
As with most of modern Shanghai, the territory of Yangpu has been formed by sediments deposited by the Yangtze River over many centuries. It was probably in the shallows of the East China Sea as late as the Tang Dynasty. During the Northern Song, the Wuyu River entered the sea somewhere around modern Wujiaochang. Daoist and Buddhist temples are known to have been established in the vicinity around this time. In 1404, the Huangpu River shifted to its present course, entering the Yangtze River around Wusong. Toward the end of the Ming Dynasty, villages along the river flourished, engaging in agriculture, banking, textiles and water-borne trade.

In 1842, the Treaty of Nanking opened Shanghai as a treaty port, and in 1863, part of present-day Yangpu District was included in the Shanghai Concession. Beginning in the 1880s, the area of contemporary Yangpu District began industrializing, with the Shanghai Machinery and Papermaking Office opening in 1882, and the Yangshupu Waterworks opening in 1883. In 1890, the Shanghai Machine Weaving Office, one of China's first modern textile weaving factories, was established. In 1899,  of what is now the south of modern Yangpu District was partitioned to become part of the International Settlement. Additional factories were constructed soon after in the area, especially along Yangshupu Road. Textile, paper-making, and shipbuilding industries were established by the early 20th century in what was then organized as part of Hongkew (now Hongkou). By the early 1920s, journalist turned revolutionary Chen Duxiu remarked in the New Youth magazine that the area of Yangshupu had become industrialized. By 1927, the area hosted 57 foreign factories, and a thriving textile industry. In 1929, the Wujiaochang farmers' market ("Pentagon Plaza") was constructed in the north. Later, during the Japanese occupation from 1937 to 1945, barracks and houses were built in the area. The inland part of the former International Settlement in the area made up part of the Shanghai Ghetto.

Following the Communist conquest of Shanghai in 1949, the area was developed. Yangpu District's boundaries expanded in 1956, 1960, and 1984. The area was especially used for heavy industries. The district's present territory west of the river was formed after the incorporation of Wujiaochang District from Baoshan County in 1984. In 1992, Yangpu's territories south of the Huangpu River were designated part of the Pudong New District.

Education 

A number of prominent universities are situated in Yangpu District, such as Fudan University, Tongji University, the Shanghai University of Finance and Economics, the Shanghai University of Electric Power, the University of Shanghai for Science and Technology, Second Military Medical University, the Shanghai University of Sport, and Shanghai Ocean University.

Both the Lycée Français de Shanghai and German School Shanghai share a "Eurocampus" in Yangpu District, which opened in 2019.

Economy 
Since the beginning of the 21st century, Yangpu District has increasingly developed away from labor-intensive industry towards commerce and high technology: the area around Wujiaochang now boast ten large commercial centers and the research and development zone on Dalian Road hosts the regional headquarters of Siemens and Continental AG.

Subdistricts
As of 2020, Yangpu District administers 12 subdistricts.

Transportation

Yangpu District is connected to the neighbouring Pudong New Area across the Huangpu River by one bridge, three tunnels, and six ferry lines. A fourth tunnel, the Yinhang Road Tunnel is currently under construction.

The Inner Ring Road and Middle Ring Road traverse through Yangpu District.

The industrial wharves along the Huangpu River which service the industrial centres of Yangpu are being phased out by residential developments on the waterfront. Yangpu District has 15.5 kilometers of bank along Huangpu River, which is the longest among all districts in Puxi. As of July 2019, 5.5 kilometers of jogging and cycling lane has been built along the bank.

Metro
Yangpu is currently served by four metro lines operated by Shanghai Metro: Line 4, Line 8, Line 10, Line 12 and Line 18.

 - Dalian Road , Yangshupu Road
 - Shiguang Road, Nenjiang Road, Xiangyin Road, Huangxing Park, Middle Yanji Road, Huangxing Road, Jiangpu Road , Anshan Xincun, Siping Road  
 - Siping Road  Tongji University, Guoquan Road , Wujiaochang, Jiangwan Stadium, Sanmen Road, East Yingao Road, Xinjiangwancheng, Guofan Road
 - Dalian Road , Jiangpu Park , Ningguo Road, Longchang Road, Aiguo Road, Fuxing Island
 - Danyang Road, Pingliang Road, Jiangpu Park , Jiangpu Road , Fushun Road, Guoquan Road , Fudan University, Zhengli Road

Sports 
Jiangwan Stadium is located in Yangpu District.

Parks and recreation 
Yangpu District is home to Gongqing Forest Park.

The Fudan University Museum, a public display of historical artefacts in possession of Fudan University, is located on the university's campus in Yangpu District.

See also 

 Districts of Shanghai

References

External links

 
 Official English-language website

 
Districts of Shanghai